Oswaldo Jose Quevedo Boschetti (born August 4, 1976 in Maracay) is a former butterfly and freestyle swimmer from Venezuela, who won the 50m and 100m Butterfly at the 2000 South American Championships (50m) in Mar del Plata. Two years later, at the later edition of the same Championship 2002 South American Championships, the sprinter from South America triumphed in the 100m Butterfly. He represented his homeland at the 2000 Olympic Games in Sydney, Australia.

He swam collegiately for the USA's Auburn University in the late 1990s.

Quevedo was part of the 200m Freestyle Relay that broke the US Open and NCAA Record at the 2000 NCAA Division I Championships in Minneapolis, Minnesota, USA.

At the 1998 Central American and Caribbean Games, he set a Games Record the 100 fly Championship Record in the preliminary heats. This record stood until the final session where it was bettered by fellow Venezuelan Swimmer Francisco Sánchez.

He currently holds the World Records in the 50m and 100m butterfly for Masters in his age group.

Lastly, Ozzie is considered by many high-profile coaches in the world as one of the best male swimmers that ever came out of Venezuela, along with Rafael Vidal Castro, Alberto Mestre, Francisco Sanchez and Albert Subirats.

References

sports-reference

1976 births
Living people
Auburn Tigers men's swimmers
Sportspeople from Maracay
Venezuelan male swimmers
Male butterfly swimmers
Venezuelan male freestyle swimmers
Olympic swimmers of Venezuela
Swimmers at the 2000 Summer Olympics
Swimmers at the 1999 Pan American Games
Swimmers at the 2003 Pan American Games
Pan American Games silver medalists for Venezuela
Pan American Games bronze medalists for Venezuela
Pan American Games medalists in swimming
Central American and Caribbean Games gold medalists for Venezuela
Competitors at the 1998 Central American and Caribbean Games
Competitors at the 2002 Central American and Caribbean Games
Central American and Caribbean Games medalists in swimming
Medalists at the 1999 Pan American Games
Medalists at the 2003 Pan American Games
20th-century Venezuelan people
21st-century Venezuelan people